{{DISPLAYTITLE:C20H36}}
The molecular formula C20H36 (molar mass: 276.51 g/mol, exact mass: 276.2817 u) may refer to:

 Taxanes, a class of diterpene
 Abietane

Molecular formulas